Cynthia Larive is an American scientist and academic administrator serving as the chancellor of University of California, Santa Cruz. Larive's research focuses on nuclear magnetic resonance spectroscopy (NMR) and mass spectrometry. She was previously a professor of chemistry and provost and executive vice chancellor at the University of California, Riverside. She is a fellow of AAAS, IUPAC and ACS, associate editor for the ACS journal Analytical Chemistry and editor of the Analytical Sciences Digital Library.

Education 
Larive received her Bachelor of Science from South Dakota State University in 1980, and her Master of Science degree from Purdue University in 1982. In 1992, she was awarded a Ph.D. in chemistry from the University of California, Riverside after working under the direction of Dallas L. Rabenstein.

Career 
Larive began her career as a professor in the chemistry department at the University of Kansas, and later joined the faculty of the University of California, Riverside, in 2005. Since 2004 she has served as the editor-in-chief of the Analytical Sciences Digital Library.

In February 2017, Larive was appointed interim provost and executive vice chancellor for University of California, Riverside, and the appointment was made permanent in October.

On May 16, 2019, Larive was announced as the new chancellor of University of California, Santa Cruz, succeeding George Blumenthal effective July 1.

Research 
Larive worked in the field of bioanalytical chemistry, applying analytical tools such as nuclear magnetic resonance spectroscopy (NMR) and mass spectrometry to the products of chemical separations. Much of her research focused on reducing the amount of sample needed for analysis, such as constructing microcoil NMR probes that can measure as little as 25 nL of sample and are usable as part of an capillary isotachophoresis apparatus. This has been applied to structure determination of heparin and heparan sulfate. She developed NMR pulse sequences to study protein ligand interactions in complexes with multiple ligands. She also researches analytical methods for metabolomics and chemogenomics for the reaction of plants to pesticides and hypoxia using NMR and mass spectroscopy.

NMR is often thought of as a low-sensitivity method, but Larive's laboratory has developed ways of increasing the sensitivity of their measurements to obtain precise chemical and structural information. The techniques she has developed are relevant to understanding carbohydrate structure and biosynthesis, designing new drugs and measuring the purity of pharmaceuticals. Her work in developing chemical profiles for substances also has relevance for the authentication of foodstuffs such as wine, olive oil, and pomegranate juice.

Awards 
Larive has received a number of awards, including the National Science Foundation CAREER Award in 1995.
She received the American Chemical Society Analytical Division's J. Calvin Giddings Award for Excellence in Education in 2007 and served as chair of the Analytical Division in 2013. In 2015, Larive received the Award for Volunteer Service to the American Chemical Society. In 2018, the Analytical Chemistry Division of the American Chemical Society honored Larive with the Award for Distinguished Service to the Field of Analytical Chemistry.

Larive is a Fellow of the American Association for the Advancement of Science (AAAS) (2008), the International Union of Pure and Applied Chemistry (IUPAC) (2004) and the American Chemical Society (ACS) (2011).

Cynthia's Raise 
In April 2022, Student Organizers hosted a rally at Kerr Hall over Chancellor Larive's raise of $105,286. Both graduate and undergraduate students protested the Chancellor's raise because of the rising cost of housing, homelessness and graduate student workers not receiving a cost of living adjustment (COLA). Union organizers Jack Davies and Sarah Mason led the rally.

References

Analytical chemists
Year of birth missing (living people)
Living people
American women chemists
Fellows of the American Chemical Society
Fellows of the American Association for the Advancement of Science
University of California, Riverside faculty
University of Kansas faculty
University of California, Riverside alumni
South Dakota State University alumni
Purdue University alumni
21st-century American chemists
21st-century American women scientists